South Pacific is a 1958 American romantic musical film based on the 1949 Rodgers and Hammerstein musical South Pacific, which in turn is loosely based on James A. Michener's 1947 short-story collection Tales of the South Pacific. The film, directed by Joshua Logan, stars Rossano Brazzi, Mitzi Gaynor, John Kerr and Ray Walston in the leading roles with Juanita Hall as Bloody Mary, the part that she had played in the original stage production. The film was nominated for three Academy Awards, winning the Academy Award for Best Sound for Fred Hynes. It is set in 1943, during World War II, on an island in the South Pacific.

Cast 
 Rossano Brazzi as Emile de Becque
 Giorgio Tozzi as Emile's singing voice
 Mitzi Gaynor as Ensign Nellie Forbush
 John Kerr as Lieutenant Joseph Cable, USMC
 Bill Lee as Cable's singing voice (uncredited)
 Ray Walston as Luther Billis
 Juanita Hall as Bloody Mary
 Muriel Smith as Bloody Mary's singing voice (uncredited)
 France Nuyen as Liat
 Russ Brown as Captain George Brackett
 Jack Mullaney as  The Professor
 Ken Clark as Stewpot
 Thurl Ravenscroft as Stewpot's singing voice (uncredited)
 Floyd Simmons as Commander Bill Harbison
 Candace Lee as Ngana
 Warren Hsieh as Jerome
 Betty Wand as Jerome's singing voice (uncredited)
 Tom Laughlin as Lieutenant Buzz Adams
 Francis Kahele as Henry, Emile's servant
 Robert Jacobs and John Gabriel as Communications men
 Richard Harrison as Co-Pilot
 Ron Ely as Navigator
 Richard H. Cutting as Admiral Kester
 Joe Bailey as U.S. commander
 Buck Class and Richard Kiser as Fighter pilots

Production 
Following the successes of the film versions of Rodgers & Hammerstein's Oklahoma! (1955) and Carousel, the producers decided to tackle a big-screen adaptation of South Pacific as their next project.

The film was produced by "South Pacific Enterprises", a company created specifically for the production, owned by Rodgers, Hammerstein, Logan, Magna Theatre Corporation (owners of the Todd-AO widescreen process the film would be photographed in), and Leland Hayward, producer of the original stage production. 20th Century Fox partially invested in the production in exchange for some distribution rights. Additionally, all the departments and department heads were Fox's, and Fox's research department re-engineered the Todd-AO process, changing its frame rate from 30 fps (for 70mm presentations) to 24 fps, thereby eliminating "simufilming" in 65mm and 35mm (as in Oklahoma!) or in 65mm 30 fps and 65mm 24 fps (as in Around the World in 80 Days), and for the most part eliminating the American Optical lenses, replacing these with Bausch & Lomb's then new Super Baltars, and for the most part replacing the Fearless Superfilm cameras with a new family of Mitchell cameras commissioned by Fox (BFC, "Blimped Fox Camera", a 65mm version of Mitchell's BNC, and FC, "Fox Camera", a 65mm version of Mitchell's NC). The original Todd-AO cameras continued to be employed, occasionally, as a B or C camera.

The producers' original plan was to have Ezio Pinza and Mary Martin, the two leads of the original Broadway cast, reprise their roles for the film, but Pinza died suddenly in May 1957. Had he lived to perform in the film, the producers would have cast Martin. Logan said he was unable to find an actor who would match Martin with the only big star the right age being Vittorio de Sica who Logan felt was "too saturnine".

Instead, Doris Day was offered the part of Nellie, but passed; Elizabeth Taylor tested for the same role, but was rejected by Rodgers after she suffered stage fright in her audition. Logan later heard her sing but was unable to persuade Rodgers to change his mind. Ultimately, Mitzi Gaynor, who had prior work in musical films, and had tested twice for Nellie, was cast in the role. Rossano Brazzi was cast as Emile, a role that was first offered to such established stars as Charles Boyer, Howard Keel, Vittorio De Sica and Fernando Lamas. Ray Walston, a noted Broadway musical actor, played the part of Seabee Luther Billis, which he'd previously played on stage in London.

Hanalei Bay, on the Hawaiian island of Kauai, served as the filming location, with Emil Kosa Jr.'s matte paintings providing distant views of the fantastic island Bali Ha'i. A second unit filmed aerial views of Fijian islands while some sources claim footage of Tioman Island, off Malaysia's south east coast, were also featured, though this seems unlikely given the logistics involved. Location filming provided sweeping shots of tropical island scenes, as well as a new sequence  not in the stage version, in which Billis, having parachuted from a damaged plane, has a boat dropped on him, then comes under a series of attacks, following his fatalistic "Oh, it's going to be one of those days, huh?"

The film includes the use of colored filters during many of the song sequences, which has been a source of criticism for the film. Director Joshua Logan wanted these filters to produce subtle changes, but 20th Century Fox, the company that would distribute the 35mm version, made them extreme changes; since tickets to the film were pre-sold (it was a roadshow attraction), there was no time to correct this.

All of the songs from the stage production were retained for the film. A song entitled "My Girl Back Home", sung by Lt. Cable and Nellie, cut from the Broadway show, was added.

One of the differences between the film version and the Broadway version of the musical is that the first and second scenes of the play are switched around, together with all the songs contained in those two scenes. The original European cut of the film shown in the United Kingdom and Europe does not switch those scenes and it plays out as on the stage. The stage version begins with Nellie and Emile's first scene together on the plantation, then proceeds to show Bloody Mary, Lieutenant Joe Cable, and the Seabees on the beach, while in the film version Lieutenant Cable is shown at the very beginning being flown by plane to the island, where the Seabees and Bloody Mary have their first musical numbers. (The first musical number in the film is "Bloody Mary", sung by the Seabees, while in the stage version it is "Dites-moi", sung by Emile's children, again the only version of this song in the final release print of the film is a reprise sung with their father Emile. It is only on the soundtrack recording that it is first heard as a duet by just the children Ngana and Jerome themselves.) Emile is not shown in the film until about thirty minutes into it; in the film, Nellie first appears during the scene with the Seabees. Because of the switch, the show's most famous song, "Some Enchanted Evening", is not heard until nearly forty-five minutes into the film, while in the show it is heard about fifteen minutes after Act I starts.

Juanita Hall sang in the stage production and took part in the recording of the stage production cast album. However, she had her singing dubbed for the film version by Muriel Smith, who played Bloody Mary in the London stage production. Metropolitan Opera star Giorgio Tozzi provided the singing voice for the role of Emile de Becque in the film. John Kerr starred as 2nd Lt. Joseph Cable, USMC and his singing voice was dubbed by Bill Lee. Ken Clark, who played Stewpot, was dubbed by Thurl Ravenscroft (who sang "You're a Mean One, Mr. Grinch" and was the voice of Tony the Tiger). Gaynor and Walston were the only principal cast members whose own singing voices were used.

Musical numbers 
Note: The film opens with an orchestral overture lasting 3 minutes and 30 seconds.
 "Bloody Mary"
 "There Is Nothing Like a Dame"
 "Bali Ha'i"
 "A Cock-Eyed Optimist"
 "Twin Soliloquies"
 "Some Enchanted Evening"
 "Dites-moi"
 "I'm Gonna Wash That Man Right Outta My Hair" (This number was abridged in the film; the soundtrack recording includes the full version.)
 "I'm in Love with a Wonderful Guy"
 "Younger Than Springtime"
 "Happy Talk"
 "Honey Bun"
 "My Girl Back Home"
 "You've Got to Be Carefully Taught"
 "This Nearly Was Mine"
 "Finale"

Release 
Magna Theatre Corporation, which originally owned a stake in the film, handled the distribution of the roadshow theatrical release in Todd-AO, while Fox distributed the film for its general release in CinemaScope. It opened at the Criterion Theatre in New York City on March 19, 1958, before opening in Miami Beach on March 24, in Philadelphia and Chicago on March 26, and expanding to a further eight cities within a month. Originally shown in a nearly three-hour roadshow version, later cut to two-and-a-half hours for general release.

The film was re-released in 1964 and by The Samuel Goldwyn Company in 1983.

Restoration 
The three-hour version, long feared lost, was rediscovered in a 70mm print owned by a collector. This print was screened in Bradford, England at the National Museum of Photography, Film, and Television on March 14, 2005. When Fox (which by that time owned partial distribution rights to the film, including home video) learned of the print's existence, it took it to the United States to reinstate the fourteen missing minutes and attempt to restore as much of the color as possible.

Home media 
A two-disc DVD set of both the longer and shorter versions was released in the USA on Region 1 on November 7, 2006, and earlier in the UK on region 2 on March 20, 2006.

On March 31, 2009, South Pacific became the first Rodgers and Hammerstein musical available on high definition Blu-ray Disc.

Box office 
South Pacific earned $7 million in theatrical rentals in the United States and Canada from its roadshow release. It reached number one at the US box office in its eighth week of release and spent three weeks at number one. It was off number one for one week before returning for another three weeks. It spent another two weeks at number one in August 1958 for a total of eight weeks. It was withdrawn from general release at the end of 1960 with rentals of $16.3 million, earning a place among the top 50 popular movies of all time at the domestic box office when adjusted for inflation and the size of the population in its era. In its 1964 reissue, the film earned another $1.2 million in rentals, taking its total to $17.5 million. The film was a big hit in the United Kingdom and the film played continuously at the Dominion Theatre in London for nearly four-and-a-half years grossing $3.9 million at the theatre. After four years of release in the UK (and prior to its general release), it had grossed $9.4 million, surpassing Gone With the Wind as the highest-grossing film in the United Kingdom. It performed badly in other European countries such as France, Germany and Italy.

South Pacific was the highest-grossing Rodgers and Hammerstein musical film until The Sound of Music was released seven years later.

Soundtrack 

The soundtrack album of the film was released in 1958. The album became a major success, reaching No.1 in both the US and UK. In the US, the album stayed at No.1 on the Billboard 200 for seven months, the fourth longest run ever. The album remained in the top five of the UK Albums Chart for 27 consecutive weeks before reaching No.1 in November 1958. It stayed at the top for a record-breaking 115 weeks and remained in the top five for 214 weeks.

The soundtrack album has spent more weeks at #1 in the UK Albums Chart than any other album, spending 115 weeks at the top in the late 1950s and early 1960s. It spent 70 consecutive weeks at the top of the chart and was #1 for the whole of 1959.

"Some Enchanted Evening" was ranked #28 on the American Film Institute's 100 Years...100 Songs (2004).

Awards and honors 
 Academy Awards (31st)
 Cinematography (Color) (nominated)
 Music (Scoring of a Musical Picture) (nominated)
 Sound (Fred Hynes) (won)

 Golden Globe Awards (16th)
 Best Motion Picture – Musical (nominated)
 Best Motion Picture Actress – Comedy/Musical (Mitzi Gaynor) (nominated)

Others 
The film is recognized by American Film Institute in these lists:
 2002: AFI's 100 Years...100 Passions – Nominated
 2004: AFI's 100 Years...100 Songs:
 "Some Enchanted Evening" – #28
 "Bali Ha'i" – Nominated
 2006: AFI's Greatest Movie Musicals – Nominated

In 2003 South Pacific was voted 39th in Channel 4's 100 Greatest Musicals (just behind Tim Burton's The Nightmare Before Christmas).

Remakes 
In 2001, a television version of the musical starring Glenn Close, Harry Connick Jr. and Rade Šerbedžija was released.

A film remake by producers Ileen Maisel and Bob Balaban starring Michelle Williams as Nellie Forbush that was announced in 2010 has not materialized.

See also 
 List of American films of 1958

References

External links 
 
 
 
 
 

1958 films
1958 romantic drama films
1950s musical drama films
American musical drama films
American romantic drama films
American romantic musical films
1950s English-language films
1950s French-language films
Films directed by Joshua Logan
Films scored by Alfred Newman
Films scored by Ken Darby
Films about race and ethnicity
Films based on short fiction
Films set in Oceania
Films that won the Best Sound Mixing Academy Award
Films about interracial romance
Pacific War films
Films about the United States Navy in World War II
Films about the United States Marine Corps
20th Century Fox films
Films based on musicals
Films set on islands
Films set on beaches
Films based on works by James A. Michener
Films based on adaptations
Tales of the South Pacific
1950s American films